Harrsjøen is a lake in Rendalen Municipality in Innlandet county, Norway. The lake has an outlet in the south through the river Hårenna, a tributary of the river Renaelva.

See also
List of lakes in Norway

References

Lakes of Innlandet
Rendalen